Nejat İşler (born 28 February 1972) is a Turkish actor and writer.  He is best known for many hit films including won Cannes Film Festivale.Some of his popular series are Behzat Ç, Gülbeyaz, Bıçak Sırtı, Keşanlı Ali Destanı, İntikam, Aliye, and Şehnaz Tango.

Biography
Nejat İşler was born in Eyüp, Istanbul. He studied at Cağaloğlu Anadolu High School, where he joined the theatre group. He took a photography course for two years at Yıldız Technical University, before serving his military service. After which he worked for some time as a salesman. After viewing the play Death of Danton, he became inspired to become an actor and joined Mimar Sinan Fine Arts University Conservatory from where he graduated in theatre.

With two friends, he formed the "Kahramanlar ve Soytarılar Theatre" and "Bodrum Deneme Sahnesi". After making his onscreen debut in the Borsa in 1993, later played films such as Eylül Fırtınası. Mustafa Hakkında Herşey and Anlat İstanbul. He played in the Turkish TV series Behzat Ç. Bir Ankara Polisiyesi as a ruthless villain with a dark sense of humor and honor. He had leading role for same role in spin off series "Saygı". He also appeared as one of the actors in the movies "Behzat Ç. Seni Kalbime Gömdüm", "Behzat Ç. Ankara Yanıyor".

He is the author of the books Gerçek Hesap Bu and Ben Hep Senin Yanındaydım. He is also the president of Gümüşlükspor football team.

Personal life
İşler was rushed to the private Bodrum Acıbadem Hospital in January 2014. He was diagnosed with respiratory failure caused by severe pulmonary infection.

Filmography

Movies

Web series

TV series

Dubbing
2014-Benim Adım Gültepe
2022-Kuş Uçuşu

Theater

References

External links

Biography of Nejat İşler

1972 births
Living people
People from Eyüp
Turkish male film actors
Turkish male television actors
Turkish male stage actors
Yıldız Technical University alumni
Academic staff of Mimar Sinan Fine Arts University
Male actors from Istanbul
21st-century Turkish male actors
Cağaloğlu Anadolu Lisesi alumni